Sandblom is a surname. Notable people with the surname include:

 Carl Sandblom (1908–1984), Swedish sailor 
 John Sandblom (1871–1948), Swedish sailor
 Linda Sandblom (born 1989), Finnish high jumper
 Philip Sandblom (1903–2001), Swedish academic, professor of surgery, and sailor

See also
 Sundblom